Neville John Bulpitt (born 15 April 1957) is a former English cricketer who was active in one-day cricket in 1979. He played as a right-handed batsman and right-arm medium pace bowler.

Bulpitt had played second XI cricket since 1975, but it wasn't until 1979 that he made his debut for Warwickshire in a List A (one-day) match against Leicestershire in the John Player League at Edgbaston. He would play two further List A matches in that tournament, against Gloucestershire at Moreton-in-Marsh, and Yorkshire at Edgbaston. He scored a total of 18 runs in his three List A matches, with a best score of 11. He took 2 wickets with the ball, with best figures of 1/31. He did not make any appearances in first-class cricket for Warwickshire.

References

External links
Neville Bulpitt at ESPNcricinfo
Neville Bulpitt at CricketArchive

1957 births
Living people
Cricketers from Coventry
English cricketers
Warwickshire cricketers